Malekoppa is a village in Shimoga district, Karnataka, India.

Demographics
Per the 2011 Census of India, Malekoppa has a total population of 329; of whom 156 are male and 173 female.

References

Villages in Shimoga district